The 1978 FIBA World Championship was the 8th FIBA World Championship, the international basketball world championship for men's teams. The tournament was hosted by the Philippines from October 1 to 14, 1978 in Rizal Memorial Coliseum in Manila and Araneta Coliseum in Quezon City (both cities in Metro Manila).

It was the first FIBA World Championship (now called the FIBA Basketball World Cup) held in Asia.

Host selection
On July 11, 1974 at the FIBA Congress held in San Juan, Puerto Rico, the Philippines was unanimously chosen as host after Argentina and Spain withdrew their bids.

Venues

(*) Temporarily reduced to 10,000 for the finals due to safety reasons.

Competing nations

Preliminary round

Group A

Group B

Group C

Classification round

Semifinal round

Final round

Seventh place playoff

Fifth place playoff

Third place playoff

Final

Final rankings

Awards

All-Tournament Team

  Krešimir Ćosić
  Dražen Dalipagić
  Dragan Kićanović
  Oscar Schmidt
  Vladimir Tkachenko

Top scorers (ppg)

 Kamil Brabenec (Czechoslovakia) 26.9
 Zhang Weiping (People's Republic of China) 25.1
 Choi Bu-Young (Korea) 21.1
 Dražen Dalipagić (Yugoslavia) 20
 Oscar Schmidt (Brazil) 19.0 
 Leo Rautins (Canada) 17.9
 Marcel De Souza (Brazil) 17.7
 Dragan Kićanović (Yugoslavia) 16.5
 Renzo Bariviera (Italy) 16.2
 Marcos Antonio Leite "Marquinhos" (Brazil) 14.7

References

External links
 
 

1978
International basketball competitions hosted by the Philippines
1978 in basketball
1978 in Philippine basketball
Sports in Manila
Sport in Quezon City